Culemborg is a railway station in Culemborg, Netherlands. The station opened on 1 November 1868 and is on the Utrecht–Boxtel railway. The station is in the southern end of the town, on the edge of the Pavijen industrial estate and near the sustainable development EVA Lanxmeer.

Train services

Bus services

External links
NS website 
Dutch Public Transport journey planner 

Railway stations in Gelderland
Railway stations opened in 1868
Railway stations on the Staatslijn H
Culemborg
1868 establishments in the Netherlands
Railway stations in the Netherlands opened in the 19th century